In geometry, the augmented dodecahedron is one of the Johnson solids, consisting of a dodecahedron with a pentagonal pyramid attached to one of the faces. When two or three such pyramids are attached, the result may be a parabiaugmented dodecahedron, a metabiaugmented dodecahedron, or a triaugmented dodecahedron.

External links
 

Johnson solids